Broekman is a Dutch toponymic surname equivalent to the Dutch surname Van den Broek. In Dutch, a broek is low-lying land regularly flooded by rivers or brooks. People with this name include:

Barend Broekman (1898–1970), Dutch film producer
 (1899–1958), Dutch-born American conductor and film score composer
Jan Broekman (born 1931), Dutch-born philosopher, legal scientist, and social scientist
Kees Broekman (1927–1992), Dutch speed skater
 (born 1986), Dutch film and TV actor
Marcel Broekman (1922–2013), Dutch-born American filmmaker, cinematographer and palmist

See also
Broekmans & Van Poppel, Dutch sheet music publisher
Brookman, surname
Brockman, surname

References

Dutch-language surnames
Dutch toponymic surnames